Vallo Allingu (born 11 January 1978 in Jõgeva, Estonia) is a retired Estonian professional basketballer who last played for Tartu Ülikool/Rock at the center position. Allingu started his senior club career with Korvpalli Meistriliiga teams like "Puuviljaparadiis" and KK Rakvere. In 2002 he joined with Tartu Ülikool/Rock and won the Estonian Championship titles in 2004, 2007, 2008 and 2010. Vallo Allingu was a member of the Estonia national basketball team. He made his national team debut in 2001 against Latvia national basketball team.

Honours 
 2003–04 Estonian League (Tartu Ülikool/Rock)
 2004–05 Estonian Cup (Tartu Ülikool/Rock)
 2006–07 Estonian League (Tartu Ülikool/Rock)
 2007–08 Estonian League (Tartu Ülikool/Rock)
 2009–10 Estonian Cup (Tartu Ülikool/Rock)
 2009–10 Estonian League (Tartu Ülikool/Rock)
 2010–11 BBL Cup (Tartu Ülikool/Rock)
 2010–11 Estonian Cup (Tartu Ülikool/Rock)
 2011–12 Estonian Cup (Tartu Ülikool)

References

1978 births
Living people
Centers (basketball)
Estonian men's basketball players
Korvpalli Meistriliiga players
Sportspeople from Jõgeva
BC Rakvere Tarvas players
Tartu Ülikool/Rock players